Indian women's cricket team toured Australia and New Zealand in month February–March 2006. The tour included one Women's Test match against Australia, series of 3 Women's One Day Internationals against Australia and series of 5 Women's One Day Internationals against New Zealand. India lost the test match by an inning, ODI series by 3–0 against Australia and 4–1 against New Zealand.

Squads

Only Test

Australia - India WODI series

India - New Zealand WODI series

References 

India 2006
India 2006
Australia 2006
February 2006 sports events in New Zealand
2006 in women's cricket
2005–06 Australian women's cricket season
cricket
2006 in Indian cricket
February 2006 sports events in Australia